Zasukhino is a rural locality (a selo) in Pribaykalsky District, Republic of Buryatia, Russia. The population was 46 as of 2010.

Geography 
Zasukhino is located 3 km west of Turuntayevo (the district's administrative centre) by road. Turuntayevo is the nearest rural locality.

References 

Rural localities in Okinsky District